Transnistrian Railway is the operator of railways in Transnistria.

History
The first railway line on the territory of Transnistria was built in 1867 from Kuchurgan station to station Tiraspol, and in 1871 to Chisinau.

In August 1894 started operation the section from Rîbnița to Park station with a bridge over the Dniester and the  tunnel on the stretch Lipcani—Matteuci.

In June 1917 locomotive depot Bender had 253 locomotives and was the largest in the South-Western railway.
From the first days of the Great Patriotic war, the road has become the frontline, was the main traffic artery in the area of hostilities. The road was used for the evacuation of industrial enterprises, terrorists were getting to the front line troops and ammunition. During the war, was destroyed 20% top, 30 station tracks, 50% of the travel buildings, major bridges on the Dniester and Prut rivers, dismantled and removed  of rail track, 90% of machining equipment, 30% of communication lines, etc.

From 1939 to 1997 operated narrow gauge railroad stove — Papelucho. In 1999 it was dismantled.
In 1946–50, restoration and modernization of the railway of Moldova was spent 3 billion rubles from the Federal budget. It was built more than 600 objects, made more than 1 million m3 of earthworks, stacked 1.7 million m3 of building materials, more than 650 thousand sleepers, the operational length reached  in 1948 the all-Union level was reached the speed of trains.
From 1953 to 1979 was merged with the Odessa Railways and was called the Odessa-Kishinev railroad.
In 1991 began the electrification of Railways Rozdilna (Ukraine) — Kuchurgan (Ukraine) — Tiraspol — Bender, because of the war in Transnistria, it was discontinued. Currently works only in Ukrainian (up to Kuchurgan) part of the contact network (though in Tiraspol are unequipped supports with hard crossbars).

In August 2004, in connection with the aggravation of relations between Moldova and the Pridnestrovian Moldavian Republic was last created state unitary enterprise "Transnistrian Railway" (the station Tiraspol, Bender and Rîbnița), which withdrew from the Moldovan Railways.

Photos

References

External links
 Transnistrian Railway

Railway companies of Moldova
Organizations based in Transnistria
Railway companies established in 2004